Jan Koprivec (born 15 July 1988) is a Slovenian footballer who plays as a goalkeeper for Tabor Sežana.

Club career
Koprivec started his career at Koper. In summer 2007, Koprivec joined Cagliari, and played two matches in the 2007–08 Coppa Italia, both of which Cagliari won; however, he did not make any appearances in the league.

In July 2008, Koprivec moved to Udinese, and immediately joined them in pre-season training. He made his league debut for Udinese on 22 March 2009 against Genoa.

On 17 August 2009, Koprivec was loaned out to Serie B side Gallipoli. He made his debut four days later, in a 1–1 draw with Ascoli. During the season, he played only eleven games with the club from Salento due to an injury that hampered his settling into the first team. He returned to Udinese at the end of the season, and was then included into the first team as a second-choice goalkeeper behind fellow Slovenian Samir Handanović.

On 15 July 2015, Anorthosis Famagusta announced that Koprivec signed a 2+1 year contract with the Cypriot club. In May 2017 it was announced that Koprivec would leave the club at the end of the season.

On 10 September 2019, Koprivec signed for Scottish Premiership club Kilmarnock on a one-year contract. He was released by the club at the end of his contract.

In August 2020, Koprivec returned to Slovenia after 13 years and signed with Tabor Sežana of the Slovenian PrvaLiga.

International career
Koprivec got his first call up to the Slovenia senior side for the team's 2018 FIFA World Cup qualifiers against Slovakia and England in October 2016.

References

External links
Career profile (from Gazzetta.it) 

1988 births
Living people
Sportspeople from Koper
Slovenian footballers
Association football goalkeepers
Slovenia youth international footballers
Slovenia under-21 international footballers
Slovenia international footballers
Slovenian expatriate footballers
Expatriate footballers in Italy
Expatriate footballers in Cyprus
Expatriate footballers in Scotland
Slovenian expatriate sportspeople in Italy
Slovenian expatriate sportspeople in Cyprus
Slovenian expatriate sportspeople in Scotland
Serie A players
Serie B players
Serie C players
Cypriot First Division players
Scottish Professional Football League players
Slovenian PrvaLiga players
FC Koper players
Cagliari Calcio players
Udinese Calcio players
A.S.D. Gallipoli Football 1909 players
S.S.C. Bari players
A.C. Perugia Calcio players
Anorthosis Famagusta F.C. players
Pafos FC players
Kilmarnock F.C. players
NK Tabor Sežana players